The following is a list of Scotland women's national rugby union team international matches.

Overall 
Scotland's overall international match record against all nations, updated to 15 November 2021, is as follows:

Full internationals

1990s

2000s

2010s

2020s

Other matches

References 

Women's rugby union in Scotland